The Grauballe Man is a bog body that was uncovered in 1952 from a peat bog near the village of Grauballe in Jutland, Denmark. The body is that of a man dating from the late 3rd century BC, during the early Germanic Iron Age. Based on the evidence of his wounds, he was most likely killed by having his throat slit. His corpse was then deposited in the bog, where his body was naturally preserved for over two millennia. His was not the only bog body to be found in the peat bogs of Jutland. Together with other notable examples,  Tollund Man and the Elling Woman, Grauballe Man represents an established tradition at the time. It is commonly thought that these killings, including that of Grauballe Man, were examples of human sacrifice, possibly an important rite in Iron Age Germanic paganism.

Grauballe Man has been described as "one of the most spectacular discoveries from Denmark's prehistory" because it is one of the most exceptionally preserved bog bodies in the world. Upon excavation in 1952, it was moved to the Prehistoric Museum in Aarhus, where it underwent research and conservation. In 1955 the body went on display at the Moesgaard Museum near Aarhus, where it can still be seen today. Due to the preservation of the man's feet and hands, his fingerprints were successfully taken.

Evidence
Grauballe Man was initially dated to the late 3rd century BC by analysing the stratigraphic layer of peat that his body was found in. This date was subsequently confirmed by radiocarbon dating his liver, the results of which were published in 1955.

Life

Information about the Grauballe Man's life has been ascertained from his remains. His hands were smooth and did not show evidence of hard work, indicating that Grauballe Man was not employed in hard labour such as farming. Study of his teeth and jaws indicated that he had suffered from "periods of starvation or a poor state of health during his early childhood." The man's skeleton showed signs of significant calcium deficiency, and his spine also suffered the early stages of spondylosis deformans, a generalized disease of aging that is secondary to the degeneration of intervertebral disks. Due to the shrinkage that the corpse suffered in the bog, the man's actual height is not known. It is known that he had dark hair, although this too was altered in the bog, and now appears reddish in colour.

Death
The corpse was not found with any artifacts or any evidence of clothing, indicating that when he died he was entirely naked, or his clothing had deteriorated, something that had also happened with the Tollund Man. The actual manner of his death was by having his throat cut from ear to ear, severing his trachea and oesophagus. Such a wound could not have been self-inflicted, indicating that this was not suicide. A damaged area to the skull that was initially thought to have been inflicted by a blow to the head, has since been determined by a CT scan to have been fractured by pressure from the bog long after his death. An analysis of the intestines found numerous scleroties of the ergot fungus Claviceps purpurea. He was around 30 years old when he died.

Discovery, preservation and exhibition

The Grauballe Man's body was first discovered buried in the bog on 26 April 1952 by a team of peat diggers. One of the workmen, Tage Busk Sørensen, stuck his spade into something that he knew was not peat; upon revealing more they discovered the head protruding from the ground, and the local postman, who was passing, alerted the local doctor as well as an amateur archaeologist named Ulrik Balslev. With the body still in the peat, various locals came to visit it over the next day, one of whom accidentally stepped on its head. The following morning, Professor Peter Glob from the Prehistory Museum at Aarhus came to visit the body, and arranged for it to be moved to the museum, still encased in a block of surrounding peat.

Glob and his team decided that they should not only research the body but that they should also attempt to preserve it so that it could be exhibited to the public. This concept was new at the time as most of the bog bodies previously discovered had been re-buried, sometimes in consecrated ground, with the Tollund Man which had been discovered two years earlier having only its head preserved. Despite the warnings of some scientists who believed that the corpse should immediately undergo preservation, it was exhibited straight away in order to capitalise on public interest. Indeed, the scientists' fears were proven right, as mould started to appear on certain areas of the body as a result of it having to be kept permanently moist.

The body then underwent research, including a post-mortem, and then preservation, which was organised by conservator C. Lange-Kornbak, who had to decide on the best way to do this, as no entire bog body had ever been preserved before. He examined various methods for doing so, before deciding on a programme of tanning the body to turn it into leather and then stuffing it with oak bark. In 1955, the body went on display at the Moesgaard Museum near Aarhus, only to be removed for a time in 2001-2002 when it underwent more modern scientific study, including radiological study, CT scanning, 3D visualisation, stereolithography and analyses of the gut contents.

Modern culture
The Grauballe Man is the subject of a poem by Seamus Heaney, as is the Tollund Man.

References

External links

The Grauballe Man – a brief description at the homepage of the Moesgård Museum
The Grauballe Man – a poem by Seamus Heaney at the homepage of BBC NI Schools
National Geographic September 2007: "Tales From the Bog"
Forensic Facial Reconstruction

1952 archaeological discoveries
3rd-century BC deaths
Archaeological discoveries in Denmark
Bog bodies
Germanic archaeological artifacts
Year of birth unknown
Deaths by blade weapons